Smukfest (also known as the Skanderborg Festival) is an annual music festival, held during the second weekend of August in Denmark. Its location, in a beech forest in the vicinity of Skanderborg, has given rise to the slogan "Denmarks' Most Beautiful Festival" (Danish: Danmarks Smukkeste Festival).

The festival covers many styles of music, such as rock, pop, folk, heavy metal, hip-hop and electronic.
The festival focuses mainly on Danish music, but with some big names from other countries e.g. Britney Spears, Eric Clapton, Prince, Pet Shop Boys, Ozzy Osbourne, Tom Jones, Fat Boy Slim, Blood Hound Gang, Rihanna and many more.

The first festival was held in 1980, and was a one-day event with 7 bands and about 600 spectators.

The festival has a mascot called "Waltidur Festismuk Kærligkys Ølimund Rockilund Trold" (Waltidur Party-beauty Loving-kiss Beer-in-mouth Rock-in-grove Troll), born in 1579, thus the festival was born on Waltidurs 400th birthday.

In 2009, Skanderborg Festival was held for the 30th time and is today the second largest festival in Denmark, after the Roskilde Festival. The festival gathered more than 50,000 people for the concerts, including 8,500 workers, most of them volunteers and has reached the current site's maximum capacity.

Stages
The festival has 4 stages (2016):
 Bøgescenerne / The Main Stages
 P3-teltet (Danish National Radio  has a station called P3)
 Stjerne-scenen (Star Stage)
 Sherwood-scenen (Sherwood Stage)

The festival main stage consist of two stages and is called "Bøgescenerne" (Beech stages).

Music performances

External links
Media related to Skanderborg Festival at Wikimedia Commons

References 

Rock festivals in Denmark
Music festivals in Denmark
Skanderborg Municipality
1980 establishments in Denmark
Tourist attractions in the Central Denmark Region
Music festivals established in 1980
Pop music festivals
Folk festivals in Denmark
Summer events in Denmark